Ryabiny is a rural locality (a village) in Vereshchaginskoye Urban Settlement, Vereshchaginsky District, Perm Krai, Russia. The population was 647 as of 2010. There are 13 streets.

Geography 
Ryabiny is located 3 km south of Vereshchagino (the district's administrative centre) by road. Vereshchagino is the nearest rural locality.

References 

Rural localities in Vereshchaginsky District